Jan Voigt (24 June 1928 – 5 December 1997) was a Norwegian actor, dancer and museum director.

Biography
He was born in Bærum as a son of Charles Antonius Voigt (1891–1962) and Nathalie Reuter Sande (1896–1986). He became a student at the Centralteatret where he made his stage debut in 1950, and remained there for four years. He was then a freelance actor, mainly at Edderkoppen, Chat Noir and Trøndelag Teater. Films include I moralens navn (1954), På solsiden (1956), and Elskere (1963). 

From 1963 to 1993, he served as director of Ringve Museum,  the national museum of music and musical instruments in Trondheim.

Voigt was also a dancer  and was also a presenter in the Norwegian Broadcasting Corporation television, hosting shows such as Firklang (1965) and Taushet er gull (1971). Voigt continued to be associated with Eurovision, by hosting the Melodi Grand Prix in 1967, 1968, 1971, and 1976.

Voigt was a board member of Norske kunst- og kulturhistoriske museer, Trondheim Symphony Orchestra and Olavsfestdagene. In 1980 he received Sør-Trøndelag County's Cultural Award (Sør-Trøndelag fylkes kulturpris).

He was appointed a Knight 1st Class of the Royal Norwegian Order of St. Olav in 1980. He died in December 1997 in Trondheim.

External links

References

1928 births
1997 deaths
Artists from Bærum
Norwegian male stage actors
Norwegian male dancers
Norwegian television presenters
NRK people
Directors of museums in Norway
Norwegian male film actors
20th-century Norwegian male actors